Bracca is a genus of moths in the family Geometridae erected by Jacob Hübner in 1820.

Species
 Bracca bajularia (Clerck, 1764)
 Bracca barbara (Stoll, [1781])
 Bracca emolliens (Walker, 1865)
 Bracca exul (Herrich-Schäffer, [1856])
 Bracca georgiata (Guenée, 1857)
 Bracca maculosa (Walker, 1856)
 Bracca matutinata (Walker, 1862)
 Bracca ribbei (Pagenstecher, 1886)
 Bracca rosenbergi (Pagenstecher, 1886)
 Bracca rotundata (Butler, 1877)
 Bracca subfumosa (Warren, 1897)

References

Boarmiini